"Love the World Away" is a song written by Bob Morrison and Johnny Wilson, and recorded by American country music artist Kenny Rogers.  It was released in June 1980 as the second single from the Urban Cowboy soundtrack. The song reached number 14 on the Billboard Hot 100, number 4 on the Billboard Hot Country Singles chart and number 8 on the Adult Contemporary chart.

In Canada, "Love the World Away" peaked at number 25 on the pop singles chart, and hit 1 on the RPM Country Tracks chart.

Charts

References

External links
 

1980 singles
Kenny Rogers songs
Liberty Records singles
Songs written by Bob Morrison (songwriter)
1980 songs
Songs written by Johnny Wilson (songwriter)